is a Japanese footballer who plays for Gainare Tottori.

Club statistics
Updated to 23 February 2017.

References

External links
Profile at Gainare Tottori

1992 births
Living people
Kokushikan University alumni
Association football people from Hokkaido
Japanese footballers
J2 League players
J3 League players
Mito HollyHock players
Gainare Tottori players
Association football midfielders
Sportspeople from Sapporo